The Khun Hynniewtrep National Awakening Movement is a political party formed in Meghalaya, India. Its former president and leader was Paul Lyngdoh, a former KSU leader.

Lyngdoh subsequently split a regional group from the party, calling it Khun Hynniewtrep National Awakening Movement (Paul Lyngdoh). In 2011, the party merged with the United Democratic Party (Meghalaya), and in 2014, Lyngdoh became the UDP's president.

Electoral History

References

Political parties in Meghalaya
Political parties with year of establishment missing